Laspeyria is a genus of moths of the family Erebidae erected by Ernst Friedrich Germar in 1810.

Taxonomy
The genus has previously been classified in the subfamilies Catocalinae or Calpinae within either the families Erebidae or Noctuidae.

Species
 Laspeyria albina Wehrli 
 Laspeyria emarginata Hüfnagel, 1767 
 Laspeyria flexula Denis & Schiffermüller, 1775 — beautiful hook-tip
 Laspeyria flexularia Hübner, 1778 
 Laspeyria grisea Lempke, 1949
 Laspeyria impuncta Lempke, 1949 
 Laspeyria lilacina Warren, 1913 
 Laspeyria obscura Lempke, 1949 
 Laspeyria rectilinealis Graeser, 1888 
 Laspeyria signata Lempke, 1949 
 Laspeyria sinuata Fabricius, 1777

References

Boletobiinae
Noctuoidea genera